was a town located in Kamiukena District, Ehime, Japan.

As of 2003, the town had an estimated population of 7,043 and a density of 42.71 persons per km². The total area was 164.92 km².

On August 1, 2004, Kuma, along with the villages of Mikawa, Omogo and Yanadani (all from Kamiukena District), was merged to create the town of Kumakōgen and no longer exists as an independent municipality.

Climate

References

External links
Kumakōgen official website in Japanese

Dissolved municipalities of Ehime Prefecture
Kumakōgen, Ehime